Anne-Marie Casey (born 7 July 1965) is a primetime TV screenwriter and producer who moved into stage adaptation and novels.

Biography
Casey was born in 1965 in the UK to an Irish father. She was educated in St Bernard's convent school before going to college in Oxford where she studied English and then Syracuse University, New York where she studied Film and TV. She became a producer and script editor with her TV shows in the primetime slot. She married writer Joseph O'Connor with whom she had two sons and moved to Killiney, Co Dublin. There she began working on scripts for RTÉ. The next step was when she began to create scripts for the stage, in 2011 she created the stage adaptation of Louisa May Alcott's classic novel Little Women. In 2014 she adapted Wuthering Heights.

During this time Casey also began to write novels. Her first came out in 2013 and was a Kirkus Reviews best book of 2013.

Novels 
Casey's debut novel An Englishwoman in New York was published in the UK and Ireland in 2013. The novel was published that same year in the US as No One Could Have Guessed the Weather.

Her second novel The Real Liddy James was published in 2016. The novel's plot follows high-powered Irish-American lawyer Liddy James as she reassesses her priorities in life following a period of high stress. Part of the novel takes place in Ireland.

Works

TV credits
 2007-2009 The Clinic
 2007 Anner House
 2000 Lady Audley's Secret
 1998 Jilting Joe
 1995 Dangerous Lady
 1995 A Village Affair
 1995 The Spy Who Caught a Cold
 1994 Capital Lives
 1998 The Jump
 1992 The Blackheath Poisonings

Plays
 2011 Little Women
 2014 Wuthering Heights

Novels
An Englishwoman in New York - UK, 2013 / No One Could Have Guessed The Weather - US, 2013
The Real Liddy James - UK and US, 2016

References

External links 
 

1965 births
Living people
Irish television writers
Irish women novelists
British women television writers
British women novelists
Irish women dramatists and playwrights
British women dramatists and playwrights
Mass media people from Dublin (city)
Alumni of the University of Oxford
Syracuse University College of Visual and Performing Arts alumni
21st-century Irish novelists
21st-century British novelists
21st-century Irish dramatists and playwrights
21st-century British women writers
21st-century British dramatists and playwrights
21st-century Irish women writers
21st-century British screenwriters
Writers from Dublin (city)
21st-century Irish screenwriters